Schefflera hierniana is a species of plant in the family Araliaceae. It is found in Cameroon and Equatorial Guinea. Its natural habitats are subtropical or tropical moist lowland forests and subtropical or tropical moist montane forests. It is threatened by habitat loss.

References

hierniana
Vulnerable plants
Taxonomy articles created by Polbot
Flora of Cameroon
Flora of Equatorial Guinea